Baljinder Singh (born 18 September 1986) is an Indian athlete who competes in the 20 kilometres race walk event. He has qualified in the 20 kilometres race walk event at the London Olympics 2012. His personal best in this event is 1:22:12.

Baljinder clocked a time of 1:25:39 in the 20 km walk event at the London Olympics and finished 43rd.

Personal life
He hails from Dera Bassi a town in the Mohali district near Chandigarh, Punjab, India. He got his sports training at Sports Authority of India, Bangalore centre under the tutelage of Ramakrishnan Gandhi.

See also
 Athletics at the 2012 Summer Olympics – Men's 20 kilometres walk

References

External links
 
 
 

Living people
1986 births
Indian male racewalkers
Athletes from Punjab, India
People from Sahibzada Ajit Singh Nagar district
Athletes (track and field) at the 2012 Summer Olympics
Olympic athletes of India
Athletes (track and field) at the 2010 Asian Games
World Athletics Championships athletes for India
Asian Games competitors for India